Los Albaricoques (the apricots) is a Spanish village in the Cabo de Gata-Níjar Natural Park – one of the White Towns of Andalusia.  It was used as a location for the movie For a Few Dollars More in which it was called Agua Caliente (hot springs).

References

 Film location shooting
 Populated places in the Province of Almería
Cabo de Gata-Níjar Natural Park